Lloyd Anoa'i (born May 7, 1971) is an American professional wrestler and professional wrestling manager. He is best known for his appearances with the World Wrestling Federation (WWF) under the ring names Tahitian Savage, Fred Williams, and Lloyd Lanui and for his appearances with Extreme Championship Wrestling (ECW) under the ring name L.A. Smooth. Making his acting debut in the movie The Wrestler and on the trailer commercial for Brisk Tea for his cousin Dwayne Johnson's movie Hobbs & Shaw and other movies. He is one of the three sons of professional wrestling patriarch Afa Anoaʻi and a member of the Anoaʻi family.

Professional wrestling career 
Anoa'i trained under his father Afa and his uncle Sika, making his wrestling debut in 1987.

Anoa'i appeared with the World Wrestling Federation (WWF) under the ring names "Tahitian Savage", "Fred Williams", and "Lloyd Lanui" in the mid-1990s. In 1993 Anoa'i began wrestling for the Puerto Rican World Wrestling Council as "Tahitian Warrior". He formed a tag team with Mohammed Hussein, winning the WWC Tag Team Championship three times in 1994. He held the Championship on a fourth occasion in 2002, teaming with Tahitian Prince as "The Tahitians".

In 1996 and 1997 Anoa'i appeared with Extreme Championship Wrestling (ECW) as "L.A. Smooth", one-half of The Samoan Gangster Party. After he went on to sign with the World Wrestling Federation in 1998. He then went on to wrestle on the American independent circuit, appearing with promotions such as World Xtreme Wrestling.

While Rikishi remained with the WWF in the early 2000s, Anoa'i tagged with Samu on the independent circuit as The Headshrinkers with Anoaʻi using the ring names "Headshrinker Alofa" and "Headshrinker Ruopa".

In addition to wrestling, Anoa'i acts as a trainer at his father's "Wild Samoan Training Center".

Championships and accomplishments 
European Wrestling Association
EWA Intercontinental Championship (1 time)
Eastern Wrestling Federation/Hardaway Wrestling
EWF/HW Tag Team Championship (1 time) – with Headshrinker Samu
Independent Superstars of Pro Wrestling
ISPW Tag Team Championship (1 time) – with Headshrinker Samu
New Horizon Pro Wrestling
NHPW Hybrid Championship (1 time)
Qatar Pro Wrestling
QPW Souq Waqif Championship (1 time)
World Wrestling Council
WWC World Tag Team Championship (9 times) – with Mohammed Hussein (3 times), Islander Kuhio (1 time), Tahitian Prince (1 time), Viper (1 time) and Afa Jr. (3 times)
World Wrestling Professionals
WWP World Tag Team Championship (1 time) – with Afa Jr.
World Xtreme Wrestling
WXW Tag Team Championship (4 times) – with Matt E. Smalls (3 times) and Afa Jr. (1 time)

See also 
 Anoa'i family
 The Samoan Gangster Party

References

External links 
 
 

1970 births
American male professional wrestlers
American professional wrestlers of Samoan descent
Anoa'i family
Living people
Sportspeople from Allentown, Pennsylvania
Professional wrestlers from Pennsylvania